Moulhoule is a town in the northern Obock region of Djibouti. It is situated on the west coast of the Red Sea, at its southern entrance.

Overview
Moulhoule is located beside the Bab el Mandeb Strait in the north-east of the Republic of Djibouti,  (by road) from Djibouti City. Nearby towns and villages include Khôr ‘Angar (27 km), Rahayta (22 km),  Assab (95 km).

References
Moulhoule, Djibouti

Populated places in Djibouti